Edvard Delorenco (31 January 1921 – 1971) was a Yugoslav sports shooter. He competed in the 50 m pistol event at the 1952 Summer Olympics.

References

1921 births
1971 deaths
Yugoslav male sport shooters
Olympic shooters of Yugoslavia
Shooters at the 1952 Summer Olympics
Sportspeople from Ljubljana
Slovenian male sport shooters